Lipstatin is a potent, irreversible inhibitor of pancreatic lipase. It is a natural product that was first isolated from the actinobacterium Streptomyces toxytricini.

The popular antiobesity drug orlistat (trade names Xenical and alli) is a saturated derivative of lipstatin.

Biosynthesis 

Lipstatin is composed of a 2-hexyl-3,5-dihydroxy-7,10-hexadecadienoic-β-lactone 22 carbon backbone from fatty acid synthesis pathway and an N-formyl-L-leucine group ester linked to the 5-hydroxyl group of the back bone. The composts of the lipstatin are ultimately from linoleic acid, octanoic acid, and L-leucine.

The 22 carbon β-lactone moiety is derived from Claisen condensation between 3-hydroxytetradeca-5,8-dienyl-CoA derived from linoleic acid and hexyl-malonyl-ACP derived from octanoic acid. Linoleic acid is first attached to CoA through some acyl-CoA synthetase homologue synthesized by lipstatin biosynthetic operons (Lst) and goes through two β-oxidation to hydroxytetradeca-5,8-dienyl-CoA. 3’ hydroxyl group from solution H2O is added by enoyl reductase homologue followed by enoyl hydratase homologue. Octanoic acid is also attached to CoA through similar  acyl-CoA synthetase homologue (LstC) to form octanoyl-CoA. Octanoyl-CoA is 2’ carboxylated and loaded to acyl carrier protein (ACP) borrowed from primary metabolism to form hexyl-malonyl-ACP.

The β-lactone ring is formed by reduction of 3-keto group by 3-hydroxysteroid dehydrogenase homologue followed by a spontaneously nucleophilic attack of the 3-hydroxyl group on the carbonyl of the ACP-tether acyl intermediate. This step follows the esterification of the N-formyl-L-leucine group.

The N-formyl-L-leucine group is derived from L-leucine. L-leucine was activated by LstE forming thioester and its α-amine group is formylated by LstF. Finally, 5-hydroxyl of 22 carbon β-lactone backbone nucleophilic attacks on the acyl carbon of the formyl-leucine and forms the lipstatin.

See also
 Discovery and development of gastrointestinal lipase inhibitors

References 

Hydrolase inhibitors
Lactones
Oxetanes
Carboxylate esters
Formamides
Lipase inhibitors